Harry Holmes may refer to:

 Harry Holmes (boxer)
 Harry Holmes (footballer) (1908–1993), English footballer
 Hap Holmes (Harry George Holmes, 1888–1941), Canadian ice hockey player
 Harry W. Holmes (1896–1986), activist for Esperanto
 Harry Holmes, a character in the TV series Hustle, played by Martin Kemp

See also
Henry Holmes (disambiguation)
Harold Holmes (disambiguation)